The 2007 African Olympic Qualifier was the first edition of the African field hockey qualification tournament for the Summer Olympics for men and women. It was held from 14 to 22 July 2007 in Nairobi, Kenya. The winners of each tournament qualified for the 2008 Summer Olympics.

2007 All-Africa Games were supposed to be the African qualifier for 2008 Olympics, but as the host country Algeria lacks suitable venues, field hockey was not part of the games, forcing the African Hockey Federation to hold a separate tournament.

Men's tournament

Pool

All times are local, EAT (UTC+3)

Classification round

Fifth and sixth place

Third and fourth place

Final

Final standings

 Qualified for the 2008 Summer Olympics

 Qualified for the Olympic qualification tournaments

Women's tournament

Pool

All times are local, EAT (UTC+3)

Classification round

Fifth and sixth place

Third and fourth place

Final

Final standings

 Qualified for the 2008 Summer Olympics

 Qualified for the Olympic qualification tournaments

References

Africa
African Olympic Qualifier
Sport in Nairobi
African Olympic qualifier
Field hockey at the Summer Olympics – African qualification
International field hockey competitions hosted by Kenya
2000s in Nairobi
African Olympic Qualifier